The Custos Rotulorum of County Kildare was the highest civil officer in County Kildare, Ireland. The position was later combined with that of Lord Lieutenant of Kildare.

Incumbents

1680–1685 Hon Robert FitzGerald 
1685–? Edward Brabazon, 4th Earl of Meath (died 1707)
1798–1804 William FitzGerald, 2nd Duke of Leinster
1804–1819 Lord Robert FitzGerald
1819–1874 Augustus Frederick FitzGerald, 3rd Duke of Leinster

For later custodes rotulorum, see Lord Lieutenant of Kildare

References

Kildare